Kattikkulam (Kartikulam) is a small town near Mananthavady in Wayanad district, Kerala, India.The office of the Thirunelly Gramapanchayath is located at Kartikulam.

This small town serves as the connection point for most of the tourists and pilgrims from Kerala and Karnataka who come to visit places like Thirunelli Temple, Bavali Maqam, Padamala church, Kuruvadweep, Tholpetty, Panavalli, Coorg, Mysore etc.

It is very well connected by road with Mananthavady, Mysore and with the district of Coorg. Almost all the buses plying from Kozhikode (Calicut) and Kannur to Mysore and vice versa during night have to pass this town because the NH 766 connecting Kozhikode (Calicut) and Mysore through Sulthan Bathery closes at 9 pm.

It is being developed as a more or less satellite town of Mananthavady. Many new infrastructure facilities are being added to this town every year.

There are a few good restaurants and hotels available in this town. Many homestays, lodges and resorts are also available in and around this area.

Two petrol bunks are functioning inside the town.

Two ATM counters run by the Kerala State Co-operative Bank and Kerala Gramin Bank also function here.

Important Organizations
 Kattikkulam Govt. Higher Secondary School
 Thirunelly Panchayath Office
 Thirunelly Panchayath Bus Stand
 RTO Checkpost, Kartikulam
 Thirunelly Police Aid Post, Kartikulam
 Post Office Kartikulam (PIN-670646)
 Thirunelly Panchayat Community Hall
 Primary Health Center, Begur, Kartikulam
 Kerala Gramin Bank
 Kerala State Co-operative Bank
 Thirunelly Service Co-operative Bank
 Holiday Hill Hotel
 Homieo hospital
 Kerala Garmin Bank ATM
 co-operative Bank ATM
 Thrissilery Village Office
 Kartikulam veterinary hospital
 Kartikulam agricultural office 
 water treatment plant KWA

Places to visit
Kuruvadweep is a 950 acre protected river delta on the Kabini River in the Wayanad district. It is home for a variety of species of birds and animals. It is about 6 km from Kattikulam town. Buses are available regularly.

Thirunelly Temple is an ancient temple and pilgrimage which is about 22 km from Kartikulam. Buses ply from Mananthavady on regular intervals.

Pakshi Pathalam is a trekking site some seven kilometers from Thirunelli temple. There is an ancient cave on the hillock with plenty of birds.

Tholpetty Wildlife Sanctuary is a very famous trekking spot which is located at a distance of 16 km from Kartikulam. Buses are available regularly.

Irupp Falls is located in the Kodagu district of Karnataka bordering the Wayanad district of Kerala. It is located at a distance of 26 km from Kartikulam.

Transportation
Kattikkulam can be accessed from Mananthavady, Mysore and Coorg.

Road distance from nearest towns:

Mananthavady -10 km

Kalpetta-33 km

Sulthan Bathery-39 km

Kannur- 96 km

Kozhikode-103 km

Mysore -100 km

Madikeri-100 km

Gudalur- 88 km

Ooty-132 km

The shortest route which connects Mananthavady with Mysore passes through Kartikulam. This road passing through Bavali usually closes after 6 pm. But the road along Kartikulam-Kutta-Gonikoppal-Mysore is open 24 hours.

The nearest railway station is at Thalassery (80 km)

Kozhikode railway station is at a distance of 106 km

Mysore railway station is at distance of 102 km

Nearest airport which is in operation is the Kannur International  Airport-73 km. The next nearest airport available is Calicut International Airport (128km).

Location 

Located on the north eastern side of Wayanad district along the road connecting Mananthavady and Mysore at a distance of 9 km from Mananthavady.

See also
Thirunelli

Bavali

Mananthavady

Kutta

References

Mananthavady Area